Opuntia aurea is a cactus that grows in Southern Utah and perhaps Northern Arizona. 

It is prostrate and forms irregularly sprawling plants to about three feet across. Occasionally a single pad may grow upright. The cactus can be spineless, have a few spines or have multiple spines. Spines may be in the distal areoles only.

References

External links
Opuntia aurea photo gallery at Opuntia Web
Opuntia aurea in Flora of North America

Flora of Utah
Flora of Arizona
aurea